Murehwa South, also spelled Murewa South, is a constituency of the National Assembly of the Parliament of Zimbabwe, located in Mashonaland East Province. Its current MP since a 26 March 2022 by-election is Nyasha Masoka of ZANU–PF. Previously, the constituency was represented by Joel Biggie Matiza, who died on 22 January 2021.

References 

Mashonaland East Province
Parliamentary constituencies in Zimbabwe